The Antwerp Dolls is a 2015 British action/crime/thriller film written and directed by Jake Reid and starring Jason Wing, Bruce Payne and Sean Cronin.

Premise
A ruthless businessman's payoff to the Belgian mafia is intercepted by his revenge-seeking former protegees, launching a deadly war of violence and double-dealing.

Cast

Jason Wing as Cally
Bruce Payne as Ray Ferrino
Sean Cronin as Max Ferrino
Sebastien Foucan as Marco
Courtney Winston as Blacks
Jermaine Curtis Liburd as Spacey
Simon Pengelly as Steve
Ashley R Woods as Corey
Terence Anderson as Mike
Danny Cutler as Sonny
Katya Greer as Jane
Nick Orchard as George
Manveer Sohal as Amir
Sean Earl McPherson as Manny
Kate Marie Davies as Christy
Tobias Jon as Floyd

Reception
The film has had screenings at a number of film festivals internationally, including the Annual Garden State Film Festival and won best feature film at the inaugural Poinciana Film Festival. Martin Stocks stated that 'despite some inevitable technical limitations due to the limited budget, The Antwerp Dolls looked impressive and left me wanting to re-watch it'. Stocks also stated that Bruce Payne and Sean Cronin were 'excellent' as the Ferrino brothers, 'with Payne quietly sinister and Cronin a more brooding presence'. Mondo Squallido stated that 'there may be a bit too much going on in this film, but I enjoyed it'. In Tony Black's view 'there's only one, slight reason to watch The Antwerp Dolls and it can be described in two words: Bruce Payne. Black stated that 'Payne is one of those B-movie actors with such slimy, educated delivery you can't help but enjoy him chewing the scenery, even when he's given the kind of painful direlogue Reid affords him in his amateurish script; one specific court-holding monologue about monkeys and dolphins is hilarious because it's trying to be so poignant'. Black lamented that 'Payne barely appears and instead we lurch from one set of tedious, morose, cartoonish Cockney villains to the next, all mostly shouting and growling angrily as they clomp their way through a narrative that wishes it was Scorsese-clever, but feels like Vinnie Jones with a hangover'.

References

External links
 
 

2015 films
2015 crime thriller films
2015 action thriller films
British action thriller films
British crime thriller films
Films shot in England
2010s English-language films
2010s British films